413 Hope St. is an American drama series which aired on the Fox network from September 11, 1997 to January 1, 1998. The series was co-created by actor/comedian Damon Wayans, who made a stark departure from his usual comedic work.

The ensemble cast—headed by Richard Roundtree—included Jesse L. Martin, Shari Headley, and Kelly Coffield.

Premise
413 Hope St. was named for the address of a New York City crisis center.  Its founder, a successful corporate executive named Phil Thomas (Roundtree), started the center in the building at the site where his teenage son was gunned down after refusing to relinquish his sneakers to a street thug.

The topics addressed by the series included drug addiction and recovery, HIV and AIDS, foster care, re-integration into society after incarceration, and homelessness.

The series was cancelled after 10 episodes, with its final broadcast airing on New Year's Day 1998.

Cast
 Shari Headley as Juanita Harris
 Jesse L. Martin as Antonio Collins
 Kelly Coffield as Sylvia Jennings
 Michael Easton as Nick Carrington
 Stephen Berra as Quentin Jefferson
 Dawn Stern as Angelica Collins
 Vincent Laresca as Carlos Martinez
 Karim Prince as Melvin Todd
 Richard Roundtree as Phil Thomas

Episodes

References

External links
 

1997 American television series debuts
1998 American television series endings
1990s American drama television series
Fox Broadcasting Company original programming
English-language television shows
Fictional portrayals of the New York City Police Department
Television shows set in New York City
Television series by 20th Century Fox Television